Caribena is a genus of spiders in the family Theraphosidae (tarantulas), found in the Antilles. The two species accepted  were formerly placed in Avicularia. Apart from a different distribution – Avicularia species are found in mainland South and Central America – Caribena is distinguished by having longer and thinner type II urticating hairs  in a conspicuous patch on the upper surface of the abdomen. Males also have a differently shaped palpal bulb.

Diagnostic 
They own type 2 urticating hairs, which are very slender, on a clearly visible area of the opisthosoma. These hairs being longer than 1mm. And males can also be distinguished by the sharp spine like "process" in the retrolateral face of the cymbium.

Taxonomy
The genus was erected in 2017 by Caroline Fukushima and Rogério Bertani for two species formerly placed in Avicularia. The genus name is derived from the Spanish word caribeña, meaning "from the Caribbean". Species of Caribena are distinguished from those of related genera by the possession of long (more than 1 mm) and very thin (less than 9 µm) type II urticating hairs carried on a conspicuous patch on the upper rear surface of the abdomen. Males have a pointed outgrowth (process) on the retrolateral lobe of the cymbium of the palpal bulb.

Species
, the World Spider Catalog accepted the following species, both transferred from the genus Avicularia:
Caribena laeta (C.L. Koch, 1842) – Puerto Rico, Cuba, US Virgin Islands
Caribena versicolor (Walckenaer, 1837) – Martinique

In synonymy 

 Caribena caesia (C. L. Koch, 1842) = Caribena laeta
 Caribena rutilans (Ausserer, 1875) = Caribena versicolor

Gallery

References

Theraphosidae
Theraphosidae genera
Spiders of the Caribbean